Glacial kame may refer to:

A kame deposited by a glacier
The Glacial Kame culture